Trivoli Township is a township in Ellsworth County, Kansas, USA.  As of the 2000 census, its population was 55.

Geography

Transportation
Trivoli Township contains one airport or landing strip, Rush Field.

References
 USGS Geographic Names Information System (GNIS)

External links
 US-Counties.com
 City-Data.com

Townships in Ellsworth County, Kansas
Townships in Kansas